Metagoniolithon is a genus of red algae belonging to the family Corallinaceae.

The species of this genus are found in Australia and Southeastern Asia.

Species
Species:
 Metagoniolithon stelligerum Weber-van Bosse

References

Corallinaceae
Red algae genera